Sheridan may refer to:

People

Surname 

Sheridan (surname)
Philip Sheridan (1831–1888), U.S. Army general after whom the Sheridan tank is named
Richard Brinsley Sheridan (1751–1816), Irish playwright (The Rivals), poet and politician
Taylor Sheridan, an American screenwriter and director

Given name 

Sheridan Le Fanu (1814–1873), Irish writer
Sheridan Morley (1941–2007), British broadcaster and writer
Sheridan Mortlock (born 2000), Australian model
Sheridan Smith (born 1981), British actress
Sheridan Tongue (fl. from 1995), British composer

Fictional characters
 John Sheridan, Anna Sheridan and David Sheridan, characters in Babylon 5
 Sheridan Bucket, an unseen character in Keeping Up Appearances
 Sheridan Crane, in Passions
 Donna and Sophie Sheridan, in Mamma Mia!
 Sheridan Whiteside, in The Man Who Came to Dinner
 Terry Sheridan, a supporting character in Lara Croft: Tomb Raider – The Cradle of Life

 Jack Sheridan, in the Virgin River show and book series

Places

United Kingdom

Sheridan, County Fermanagh, a townland in County Fermanagh, Northern Ireland
Sheridan, County Tyrone, a townland in County Tyrone, Northern Ireland

United States

Sheridan, Arkansas
Sheridan, California
Sheridan, Colorado
Sheridan, Illinois
Sheridan, Indiana
Sheridan County, Kansas
Sheridan, Michigan
Sheridan, Minneapolis
Sheridan, Missouri
Sheridan, Montana
Sheridan County, Montana
Sheridan, Nebraska
Sheridan County, Nebraska
Sheridan, Nevada
Sheridan, New York
Sheridan County, North Dakota
Sheridan, Oregon
Sheridan, South Dakota
Sheridan, Texas
Sheridan, Washington
Sheridan, West Virginia
Sheridan, Wisconsin, Dunn County
Sheridan, Waupaca County, Wisconsin
Sheridan, Wyoming
Sheridan County, Wyoming
Sheridan station (CTA), Chicago, Illinois
Sheridan Circle, a traffic circle in Washington, D.C.

Other uses
 Sheridan (album), by Sheridan Smith, 2017
 Sheridan (automobile), a 1920s brand of American automobile 
 Sheridan College, in Canada
 Sheridan College (Wyoming), in the U.S.
 M551 Sheridan, an American light tank
 USS Sheridan (APA-51), a U.S. Navy ship
 Sheridan, the name of USS Stettin after she was decommissioned
 Sheridan's, an alcoholic drink

See also

Sheridan High School (disambiguation)
 Fort Sheridan, Illinois
 Fort Sheridan station
 Mount Sheridan, Yellowstone National Park, Wyoming
 Sheridan v. United States, 1988 U.S. Supreme Court case